Ernst-Ludwig Winnacker (born 26 July 1941 in Frankfurt) is a German geneticist, biochemist and research manager. His main fields of research are virus/cell interaction, the mechanisms of gene expression in higher cells and prion diseases. He was President of the German Research Foundation and Secretary General of the European Research Council and is Secretary General of the Human Frontier Science Program Organization.

Life and work 
Ernst-Ludwig Winnacker is the son of the German chemist and former CEO of the Hoechst AG Karl Winnacker.

He studied chemistry at the Swiss Federal Institute of Technology (ETH Zurich) where he obtained his Ph.D. in 1968. Winnacker took part in an effort to chemically synthesize the Vitamin B12. From 1968 to 1972 he took a postdoctoral research position at the University of California, Berkeley, to work with Horace Barker, who discovered the active form of vitamin B12. Winnacker set out to isolate enzymes involved in B12 synthesis. While at the Karolinska Institute in Stockholm, Sweden he became intrigued by the use of recombinant DNA and associated techniques to synthesize and manipulate DNA. In 1972 he became assistant and then DFG Visiting professor at the Institute for Genetics, University of Cologne. In 1977 he was appointed associate professor at the Institute of Biochemistry at the Ludwig Maximilian University of Munich where he was made full professor in 1980. From 1984 to 1997, he was Director of the Laboratory of Molecular Biology at the University of Munich Gene Center.

In 1998 he was elected President of the German Research Foundation (DFG), a position he held until the end of 2006. From 2003 to 2004 he was Chairman of the European Heads of Research Councils (EUROHORCs) which introduced the EURYI Award and, from 2000 to 2004, Member of the European Group on Life Science (established by European Commissioner for Research Philippe Busquin). From 2007 to 2009 he served as the first Secretary General of the European Research Council (ERC). In 2009 he became as successor of the nobel prize winner Torsten Wiesel Secretary General of the Human Frontier Science Program Organization.

Honours and distinctions 

 1992 Bavarian Order of Merit
 1994 Arthur Burckhardt Prize
 1996 Officer's Cross of the Order of Merit of the Federal Republic of Germany
 1999 Honorary doctorate of the University of Veterinary Medicine Vienna, Austria 
 1999 Bavarian Maximilian Order for Science and Art
 1999 Member of the Inventors gallery of the German Patent and Trade Mark Office
 1999 Zimmermann Prize for Cancer Research 
 2006 Commander's Cross of the Order of Merit of the Federal Republic of Germany 
 2006 Chevalier de la Legion d’Honneur  
 2007 Commanders's Cross of the Order of Merit of the Republic of Poland  
 2009 International Science and Technology Cooperation Award of the People's Republic of China  
 2009 Order of the Rising Sun, Gold and Silver Star of Japan   
 2010 Grand Cross with Star (Knight Commander's Cross) of the Order of Merit of the Federal Republic of Germany  
 2011 Robert Koch Gold Medal

Positions in scientific societies and boards 

 1984 - 1987 Expert Member of the Enquete Commission of the German Parliament  
 Since 1988 Member of the Scientific-Technical Advisory Council of the Bavarian State Government  
 Since 1988 Member of the Academy of Natural Scientists Leopoldina  
 Since 1989 Member of the Academia Europaea  
 Since 1989 Member of the International Science Committee of the National Academy of Science in Beijing, China  
 Since 1993 Member of the North Rhine-Westphalia Academy for Sciences and Arts  
 Since 1994 External Vice President of the Academy of Natural Scientists Leopoldina in Halle  
 Since 1997 Member of the Göttingen Academy of Sciences  
 Since 1998 Member of the Berlin-Brandenburg Academy of Sciences and Humanities  
 Member of the Institute of Medicine - National Academy of Sciences, Washington  
 2000 - 2004 Member of the European Life Science Group of EU Commissioner Philipe Busquin  
 2000 - 2003 Member of the German National Ethics Board

Literature

External links 
 
 Profile of HFSPO Secretary General Ernst-Ludwig Winnacker

References 

1941 births
Academic staff of the Ludwig Maximilian University of Munich
German biochemists
German geneticists
Members of Academia Europaea
Chevaliers of the Légion d'honneur
Commanders of the Order of Merit of the Republic of Poland
Recipients of the Order of the Rising Sun, 2nd class
Knights Commander of the Order of Merit of the Federal Republic of Germany
Scientists from Munich
Living people
Scientists from Frankfurt
University of California, Berkeley alumni
ETH Zurich alumni
Members of the National Academy of Medicine